William Augustus Larned (December 30, 1872 – December 16, 1926) was an American tennis player who was active at the beginning of the 20th century. He won seven singles titles at the U.S. National Championships.

Biography

Larned was born and raised in Summit, New Jersey on the estate of his father, William Zebedee Larned, a wealthy lawyer and a major landowner in Summit. Stoneover, the manor house in which he grew up, today houses the administrative and faculty offices of the Oak Knoll School. Larned Road in Summit honors both father and son; Brayton School in Summit was named in honor of his younger brother Brayton, who died at age 15. He came from a family that could trace its American roots to shortly after the arrival of the Mayflower. In 1890 he came to Cornell University to study mechanical engineering. He first gained fame in his junior year, when he became the first (and to this day, the only) Cornellian to win the intercollegiate tennis championship.

An all-around athlete, Larned captained the St. Nicholas Hockey Club in 1896–97 and was also a horseman, golfer, and rifle shot. He invented the steel-framed racquet in 1922 and founded a company to manufacture it.

Larned won the title seven times, as did Richard Sears before him and Bill Tilden after. Larned was a member of the U.S. Davis Cup Team in 1902–03, 1905, 1908–09 and 1911–12. Larned achieved a career-high U.S. ranking of No. 1. He twice participated in the Wimbledon Championships, in 1896 and 1905, but could not match his success at home, losing on both occasions in the quarterfinals.

Larned also won other tournaments multiple times including the Middle States Championships four times (1894–95, 1897, 1907), and the Longwood Challenge Bowl five times (1894, 1897, 1903–1907).

He was inducted in the International Tennis Hall of Fame in 1956.

Larned in 1898 had served in the Spanish–American War as one of Theodore Roosevelt's Rough Riders. While serving in the war, Larned caught rheumatism in Cuba; rheumatoid arthritis later deteriorated his health forcing him to retire from tennis after losing the Davis Cup challenge round in early 1912. Partially paralyzed by spinal meningitis, he was unable to do any of the activities he loved most, and became depressed. On the evening of December 15, 1926, inside the private chambers of the exclusive Knickerbocker Club in Manhattan, the 53-year-old Larned committed suicide by shooting himself.

Playing style
In their book R.F. and H.L. Doherty - On Lawn Tennis (1903) multiple Wimbledon champions Reginald and Laurence Doherty described Larned's playing style:

On Lawn Tennis - 1903

Grand Slam finals

Singles: 9 (7 titles, 2 runners-up)

Performance timeline

Events with a challenge round: (WC) won; (CR) lost the challenge round; (FA) all comers' finalist

References

External links
 
 
 
 
 Spanish–American War Military Service Record
 Rough Rider - Cornell Magazine (Jul/Aug 1998) Biography

1872 births
1926 deaths
19th-century American people
19th-century male tennis players
American male tennis players
Cornell Big Red men's tennis players
Sportspeople from Summit, New Jersey
International Tennis Hall of Fame inductees
Tennis people from New Jersey
United States Army soldiers
United States National champions (tennis)
Grand Slam (tennis) champions in men's singles
1926 suicides